Moriori was a Polynesian language most closely related to New Zealand Māori and was spoken by the Moriori, the indigenous people of New Zealand's Chatham Islands (Rēkohu in Moriori), an archipelago located east of the South Island.

History
The Chatham Islands' first European contact was with William R. Broughton of Great Britain who landed on 29 November 1791 and claimed the islands which he named after his ship, HMS Chatham. Broughton's crewmen intermarried with the women of Moriori.

The genocide of the Moriori people by mainland Māori iwi (tribes) Ngāti Mutunga and Ngāti Tama occurred during the autumn of 1835. Approximately 300 were killed, around one sixth of the original population. Of those who survived, some were kept as slaves, and some were subsequently eaten. The Moriori were not permitted to marry other Moriori or have children with them, which caused their survival and that of their language to be endangered. The impact on the Moriori population, culture, and language was so severe that by 1862 only 101 Moriori remained alive, and by the 1870s few spoke the language. 

The three principal documents on which knowledge of the Moriori language is now based are a manuscript petition written in 1862 by a group of surviving Moriori elders to Governor George Grey, a vocabulary of Moriori words collected by Samuel Deighton, Resident Magistrate from 1873 to 1891, published in 1887, and a collection of Moriori texts made by Alexander Shand and published in 1911.

The death of the Moriori language went unrecorded, but Johann Friedrich Wilhelm Baucke (1848–1931) was the last man who could speak it. 

Samuel Deighton’s vocabulary of Moriori words was republished as an appendix of Michael King's Moriori: A People Rediscovered (1989).

The language was reconstructed for Barry Barclay's 2000 film  documentary The Feathers of Peace, in a recreation of Moriori contact with Pākehā and Māori.

In 2001, as part of a cultural revival movement, Moriori people began attempts to revive the language, and compiled a database of Moriori words. There is a POLLEX (Polynesian Lexicon Project Online) database of Moriori words as well. A language app is available for Android devices.

The 2006 New Zealand census showed 945 people choosing to include "Moriori" amongst their tribal affiliations, compared to 35 people in the 1901 census. In the 2013 New Zealand census the number of people who identified as having Moriori ancestry declined to 738, however members of the imi (Moriori equivalent for iwi) estimate the population to be as many as 3,500.

In 2021 an app called Ta Re Moriori was launched in order to teach the Moriori language to as many new people as possible.

Alphabet 
 a - [a]
 e - [ɛ]
 i - [i]
 o - [ɔ]
 u - [u]
 ā - [aː]
 ē - [ɛː]
 ī - [iː]
 ō - [ɔː]
 ū - [uː]
 p - [p]
 t - [t]
 k - [k]
 m - [m]
 n - [n]
 ng - [ŋ]
 wh - [ɸ]
 h - [h]
 w - [w]
 r - [r]

Comparison with Maori 

Words in Moriori often have different vowels from their Māori counterparts. In this regard, it is similar to the Southern dialects of Māori, in which apocope is occasionally found. A vowel is also sometimes dropped after a vowel in the case the preceding vowel is lengthened and sometimes before a vowel, where the remaining vowel is lengthened.

References

Further reading
 Clark, R. (1994). "Moriori and Maori: The Linguistic Evidence". In Sutton, D. (ed) The origins of the First New Zealanders. Auckland: Auckland University Press. pp. 123–135.
 Galbraith, Sarah. A Grammar of the Moriori language.

 Taiuru, K.N. (2016). Word list and analysis of te reo Moriori.

Moriori
Extinct languages of Oceania
Languages of New Zealand
Tahitic languages
Languages extinct in the 1890s
1898 disestablishments in Oceania